Milton Keynes South West was a constituency represented in the House of Commons of the Parliament of the United Kingdom from 1992 to 2010. It elected one Member of Parliament (MP) by the first past the post system of election.

History
Construction of Milton Keynes began in 1967, as a new town. Until 1983, it was part of the Buckingham constituency. As its population grew, Milton Keynes then gained its own constituency, which was taken by William Benyon of the Conservative Party.

Uniquely outside the normal cycle of periodic reviews by the Boundary Commission, the continuing expansion in the population of Milton Keynes led to this constituency being divided in two for the 1992 general election (Milton Keynes South West and North East Milton Keynes).

The new South West constituency was taken by Barry Legg of the Conservatives, who lost the seat to Labour's Phyllis Starkey in the 1997 election. The Milton Keynes South West seat was abolished, and replaced with the Milton Keynes South seat for the 2010 general election. Phyllis Starkey ran in the Milton Keynes South seat, but lost to the Conservative candidate Iain Stewart.

Boundaries
The constituency was one of two covering the Borough of Milton Keynes. It included the more urban parts of the borough: Bletchley, Fenny Stratford, Loughton, the Shenleys, Stony Stratford and more modern districts in between.

The constituency consisted of 12 electoral wards of the Borough of Milton Keynes: Church Green, Denbigh, Eaton, Fenny Stratford, Loughton, Manor Farm, Newton, Stony Stratford, Whaddon, Wolverton, Wolverton Stacey Bushes, and Woughton.

The Stony Stratford, Wolverton and Wolverton Stacey Bushes wards were transferred from the Buckingham constituency.

Boundary review
Following their review of parliamentary representation in Buckinghamshire, the Boundary Commission for England created two new seats for Milton Keynes, effectively replacing the current South West/North East division with a North and South division from the 2010 general election.

Members of Parliament

Elections

Elections in the 2000s

Elections in the 1990s

See also
Milton Keynes North East
List of parliamentary constituencies in Buckinghamshire

Notes and references

Constituencies of the Parliament of the United Kingdom established in 1992
Constituencies of the Parliament of the United Kingdom disestablished in 2010
Politics of Milton Keynes
Parliamentary constituencies in Buckinghamshire (historic)